The Greater Dallas Open was a golf tournament on the Web.com Tour. It was played in June 2015 at The Lakes at Castle Hills in Lewisville, Texas, a city in the Dallas–Fort Worth metroplex.

Winners

Bolded golfers graduated to the PGA Tour via the Web.com Tour regular-season money list.

References

External links
Coverage on the Web.com Tour's official site

Former Korn Ferry Tour events
Golf in Texas
Sports in the Dallas–Fort Worth metroplex